Didier Dubois is the name of:

 Didier Dubois (mathematician) (born 1952), French mathematician
 Didier Dubois (athlete) (born 1957), French sprinter
 a fictitious character in Driv3r